The Korea Masters is an international badminton tournament that usually held in November or December every year of BWF event calendar in South Korea. The total prize money in 2016 was US$120,000. Before 2010, the level of the tournament was an International Challenge, which is the fourth level tournament of international badminton tournament.  It began in 2007, when it was held in Suwon, then it moved to Yeosu in 2008 and Hwasun in 2009. In 2010, it was turned into a BWF Grand Prix event.

It became a BWF Grand Prix Gold event in 2011, and it remained at that level through the end of Grand Prix Gold in 2017, with the exception of 2014, when it changed back to Grand Prix status, the same year Korea hosted both the Asian Games and the Badminton Asia Championships.  The tournament was held in cities in the southwest from 2011 to 2017: in Hwasun in 2011 and 2012, then  in Jeonju for 2013 to 2015, then Seogwipo and Gwangju. In 2015, the name of the tournament changed to Korea Masters. 

In 2018, this tournament is the part of the BWF World Tour Super 300, after the Grand Prix Gold event ceased.

History of host cities

Winners 

 World Tour Super 300
 Grand Prix Gold
 Grand Prix

Performances by nation

Note

References

External links 
Official website

 
Badminton tournaments in South Korea
Recurring sporting events established in 2007
2007 establishments in South Korea